Jimmy Ngutlik (born 21 October 2000) is a Papua New Guinean professional rugby league footballer who plays as a  er for the Western Suburbs Magpies in the New South Wales Cup and Papua New Guinea at international level.

Career
Ngutlik made his international debut for Papua New Guinea in their 32-16 win over Cook Islands in the 2021 Rugby League World Cup. 
In the final group stage game at the 2021 Rugby League World Cup, Ngutlik scored two tries for Papua New Guinea in the 36-0 victory over Wales.

References

External links
PNG Kumuls profile
Western Suburbs Magpies

2000 births
Living people
Western Suburbs Magpies players
Papua New Guinea national rugby league team players
Papua New Guinean rugby league players
Rugby league wingers